Admiral Hugh Lindsay Patrick Heard, CB, DSO (2 August 1869 – 23 July 1934) was a Royal Navy officer who served during the First World War.

References 

 http://www.dreadnoughtproject.org/tfs/index.php/Hugh_Lindsay_Patrick_Heard

1869 births
1934 deaths
Companions of the Order of the Bath
Companions of the Distinguished Service Order
Royal Navy admirals